和田 may refer to:

Mandarin Chinese reading Hétián
Hotan, city in Xinjiang, People's Republic of China
Hotan Prefecture in Xinjiang, People's Republic of China

Japanese reading Wada:
Wada, Chiba, former town in Awa District, Chiba, Japan
Wada, Nagano, former village in Chiisagata District, Nagano, Japan
Wada Station, Akita, Akita Prefecture, Japan